John K. Collum (June 29, 1926 — August 28, 1962) was an American child actor. He appeared in many Our Gang films of the 1930s as the character Uh-Huh.

Career
Born in Chicago, Illinois, Collum was the son of Hal Roach's casting director, Joseph Collum. He first appeared in the 1932 short, A Lad an' a Lamp. He was never a regular cast member and portrayed a character named Uh-Huh. Uh-Huh answered most of his questions with a drawn-out "Uh-huuuuuh". After 1933, Collum was used as an extra whenever a large group children was needed. He appeared in many films from 1934 to 1938. His final appearance in the Our Gang series is in the 1938 short Three Men in a Tub.

Death
Two months past his 36th birthday, Collum died of a heart attack in Los Angeles. He is interred in the Valhalla Memorial Park Cemetery in North Hollywood.

He was married to Lois Rae Collum, and was the father of James, Sharon and John Collum.

Our Gang filmography

A Lad 'an a Lamp (1932)
Fish Hooky (1933)
Forgotten Babies (1933)
Mush and Milk (1933)
Washee Ironee (1934)
Little Sinner (1935)
Our Gang Follies of 1936 (1935)
The Pinch Singer (1936)
Arbor Day (1936)
Bored of Education (1936)
Too Two Young (1936)
Pay as You Exit (1936)
Spooky Hooky (1936)
Glove Taps (1937)
Hearts Are Thumps (1937)
Rushin' Ballet (1937)
Fishy Tales (1937)
Framing Youth (1937)
The Pigskin Palooka (1937)
Mail and Female (1937)
Our Gang Follies of 1938 (1937)
Three Men in a Tub (1938)

Solo filmography

The A-B-C's of Love (1953)
The Music Man (1962; final film appearance)

External links

Male actors from Illinois
1926 births
1962 deaths
Burials at Valhalla Memorial Park Cemetery
20th-century American male actors
Hal Roach Studios actors
Our Gang